V. glabella  may refer to:
 Viola glabella, the stream violet or pioneer violet, a plant species found in northeastern Asia and northwestern North America
 Volutomitra glabella, a sea snail species

See also
 Glabella (disambiguation)